Norman C. Anderson (March 11, 1928 – June 27, 2020) was a former Speaker of the Wisconsin State Assembly.

Biography
Anderson was born on March 11, 1928, in Hammond, Indiana. He graduated from the University of Wisconsin–Madison in 1951 and the University of Wisconsin Law School in 1954.

Career
Anderson served in the United States Army from 1946 to 1947 and later became a practicing lawyer. He was elected to the Assembly in 1956 and became Assistant Majority Leader in 1965. In 1971, he served as Majority Leader and later that year became Speaker. Additionally, he served as Coroner of Dane County, Wisconsin, as well as Court Commissioner of Dane County. He is a Democrat.

References

1928 births
2020 deaths
People from Hammond, Indiana
Democratic Party members of the Wisconsin State Assembly
Wisconsin lawyers
American coroners
Military personnel from Wisconsin
United States Army soldiers
University of Wisconsin–Madison alumni
University of Wisconsin Law School alumni